The Chicago Mill Company Office Building is a historic commercial building at 129 North Washington Street in West Helena, Arkansas.  It is a single-story wood-frame structure, whose Craftsman styling includes broad eaves and a wraparound porch supported by square columns.  Built c. 1920, it housed the local offices of the Chicago Mill Company, one of the largest lumber concerns to operate in West Helena when that business was booming in the 1920s and 1930s.  It is one of the few commercial buildings in West Helena to survive from that time.

The building was listed on the National Register of Historic Places in 1996.

See also
National Register of Historic Places listings in Phillips County, Arkansas

References

Office buildings on the National Register of Historic Places in Arkansas
Buildings and structures completed in 1920
Buildings and structures in Phillips County, Arkansas
National Register of Historic Places in Phillips County, Arkansas